São Paulo Athletic Club - officially these days Clube Atlético São Paulo, but generally referred to as SPAC, is a Brazilian sports club founded on 13 May 1888 by Charles William Miller and several English immigrants, being one of the first association football clubs in the country. Although football is not practised anymore, SPAC currently hosts the practice of futsal, rugby union, squash, swimming, tennis and volleyball.

History
São Paulo Athletic Clube was established by the British community living in São Paulo, in 1888. Those British residents used to play cricket at the Pirituba field, property of British company São Paulo Railway Co.

One of the most notable members and sportsmen in the club history was Charles Miller, who after returning to his native country from England (where he had studied) began to actively participate in the development of the club. Miller (who was 19 and is considered the "father" of Paulista football) introduced football and rugby to the club in 1895, even bringing some footballs and a rules book to teach the basis of the sport there. SPAC and Miller were founding members of the Campeonato Paulista, the first football tournament not only of São Paulo but Brazil, whose first edition was in 1902. SPAC won the championship, being Miller also the top scorer of the tournament with 10 goals. SPAC would win 3 more titles  (in 1903, 1904 and 1911), totalizing four football championships.

1911 was the last successful year of football in the club. SPAC won the last game vs. SC Germania by 2-0, winning the last title for the club. The final game was played on 20 October 1912 against the same club. After that, SPAC retired from official football competitions, although the sport continued being practised at the institution but only for recreation. The club was also a founding member of the São Paulo Tennis Federation.

With football out of competition, rugby became the main sport of the club. In 1932 and 1936 the Brazilian national team played South Africa and England, with most of its players called up from SPAC. Due to World War II rugby came to a hiatus until 1947 when the British players returned to Brazil, although the number of enthusiasts had decreased. In 1948 Jimmy Macintyre retired from rugby but he would never leave the sport, dedicating to manage the team and organizing a tour in 1950.

The Brazilian toured on Uruguay, where the team won the three games played, including the final match by 20-0. By the end of the 1940s, Irish Harry Donovan arrived in Brazil. Donovan would be president of the club (1964–65), then founding the Brazilian Rugby Union in 1963 along with Macyntire.

Honours

Football
 Campeonato Paulista (4): 1902, 1903, 1904, 1911

Rugby union
Men's
Campeonato Brasileiro (10): 1964, 1965, 1966, 1967, 1968, 1969, 1974, 1975, 1976, 1999
Campeonato Paulista (1): 1999
Recopa (2): 2005, 2008
Women's
 Campeonato Paulista (4): 2006, 2007, 2008, 2009

Notes

External links

Official Website

 
Defunct football clubs in São Paulo (state)
Brazilian rugby union teams
Association football clubs established in 1888
Rugby union teams in São Paulo (state)
1888 establishments in Brazil
British association football clubs outside the United Kingdom
Diaspora football clubs in Brazil